Michalis Papanikolas (born 28 March 1993) is a Greek professional footballer who plays as a centre-back for Super League 2 club Egaleo.

Honours
Egaleo
Gamma Ethniki: 2018–19

References
Papanikolas
Απέκτησε Παπανικόλα ο Εθνικός

1993 births
Living people
Proodeftiki F.C. players
Olympiacos Volos F.C. players
Ethnikos Piraeus F.C. players
Association football defenders
Footballers from Athens
Greek footballers